The 2016–17 Campeonato Nacional season was the 86th season of top-flight football in Chile. Universidad Católica were the defending champions.

Format changes
Same as last season: Apertura and Clausura format, without playoffs.

Teams

Stadia and locations

Personnel and kits

Torneo Apertura

Standings

Results

Runners-up playoff
The runners-up playoff was played between:
O'Higgins (2016 Clausura third place)
Unión Española (2016 Apertura third place)

The winner qualified for the 2017 Copa Libertadores second stage, while the loser qualified for the 2017 Copa Sudamericana first stage.

Top goalscorers

Source: Soccerway

Torneo Clausura

Standings

Results

Top goalscorers

Source: Soccerway

Aggregate table

References

External links
ANFP 

2016–17 Campeonato Nacional season
2016–17 in Chilean football
2016 in South American football leagues
Primera División de Chile seasons